Pachyneuridae is a family of flies of the infraorder Bibionomorpha, order Diptera. There are at least 8 described species in 7 genera in Pachyneuridae. The larvae live in rotting wood.

Genera
 Cramptonomyia
 Haruka
 Pachyneura
 Pergratospes

References

Further reading

External links

 

Bibionomorpha 
Nematocera families